Mylavaram Dam is a medium irrigation project in Andhra Pradesh, India. This barrage is located across the Penna river in Kadapa district near Mylavaram. With the completion of srisailam right bank canal, Krishna River water would be fed from Srisailam reservoir to this reservoir. The reservoir has a gross storage capacity of 9.96 tmcft.

See also
Somasila Dam
PABR Dam
MPR Dam
Pothireddypadu Reservoir
Jeedipalli Reservoir
Veligallu Dam Reservoir

References

Dams in Andhra Pradesh
Buildings and structures in Kadapa district
Year of establishment missing